Anthony David Black (born January 20, 2004) is an American college basketball player for Arkansas Razorbacks of the Southeastern Conference (SEC).

Early life and high school
Black grew up in Duncanville, Texas and initially attended Coppell High School. He averaged 16.3 points, 6.8 rebounds, 3.5 assists, and 2 steals per game as a junior and was named second-team all-area. He transferred to Duncanville High School in Duncanville, Texas before the start of his senior year. Black played in only 15 games during his season due to eligibility issues and averaged 13.5 points, 5.8 rebounds, 4.0 assists, and 2.2 steals per game.

Black was rated a five-star recruit and committed to play college basketball at Arkansas after considering offers from Gonzaga, Oklahoma State, and TCU. He also considered playing professionally in the NBA G League.

College career
Black entered his freshman season at Arkansas as a starter at guard. He also entered the season as a potential first-round selection in the 2023 NBA draft. Black averaged 22 points over three games during the 2022 Maui Invitational Tournament and was named the Southeastern Conference (SEC) Freshman of the Week.

National team career
Black played for the United States under-18 basketball team at the 2022 FIBA Under-18 Americas Championship.

References

External links
Arkansas Razorbacks bio
USA Basketball bio

2004 births
Living people
African-American basketball players
American men's basketball players
Arkansas Razorbacks men's basketball players
Basketball players from Texas
McDonald's High School All-Americans
Shooting guards